Daniel Suchánek (born 21 June 1993) is a Czech male canoeist who won four medals at senior level at the Wildwater Canoeing World Championships.

Medals at the World Championships
Senior

References

External links
 

1993 births
Living people
Czech male canoeists
Place of birth missing (living people)